Abharrud Rural District is in the Central District of Abhar County, Zanjan province, Iran. At the National Census of 2006, its population was 5,686 in 1,300 households. There were 5,132 inhabitants in 1,450 households at the following census of 2011. At the most recent census of 2016, the population of the rural district was 4,734 in 1,492 households. The largest of its 13 villages was Funeshabad, with 1,762 people.

References 

Abhar County

Rural Districts of Zanjan Province

Populated places in Zanjan Province

Populated places in Abhar County